Nowe Sarnowo  is a village in the administrative district of Gmina Dzierzążnia, within Płońsk County, Masovian Voivodeship, in east-central Poland. Despite being founded for a significant period of time, its population has remained low.

References

Nowe Sarnowo